Princeton Township is one of twelve townships in White County, Indiana, United States. As of the 2010 census, its population was 1,553 and it contained 644 housing units.

Princeton Township was organized in 1844, and named after the ship on which an early settler had immigrated to America.

Geography

Cities, towns, villages
 Wolcott

Unincorporated towns
 Seafield at 
(This list is based on USGS data and may include former settlements.)

Adjacent townships
 Milroy Township, Jasper County (north)
 Monon Township (northeast)
 Honey Creek Township (east)
 West Point Township (south)
 Gilboa Township, Benton County (southwest)
 Carpenter Township, Jasper County (west)
 Jordan Township, Jasper County (west)

Cemeteries
The township contains these five cemeteries: Apostolic, Dobbins, Palestine, Palestine and Wolcott.

School districts
 Tri-County School Corporation

Political districts
 Indiana's 4th congressional district
 State House District 16
 State Senate District 07

References
 United States Census Bureau 2007 TIGER/Line Shapefiles
 United States Board on Geographic Names (GNIS)
 IndianaMap

External links
 Indiana Township Association
 United Township Association of Indiana

Townships in White County, Indiana
Townships in Indiana